La ragazza del prete (The girlfriend of the priest) is a 1970 Italian romantic comedy film directed by Domenico Paolella.

Cast 

 Nicola Di Bari: Don Michele / Nicola 
 Susanna Martinková: Erika 
 Isabella Biagini: Maria Innocenza Furlan  
 Mario Carotenuto: Cardinal Mimì  
 Toni Ucci: "Giaguaro" 
 Gisella Sofio: Antonella 
 Umberto D'Orsi: Commissario Pieretti  
 Antonella Steni: De Magistris 
 Giacomo Furia: Il sacrestano 
 Fiorenzo Fiorentini 
 Hélène Chanel  
 Tuccio Musumeci  
 Elio Crovetto

References

External links

1970 films
1970 romantic comedy films
1970s Italian-language films
Italian romantic comedy films
Films directed by Domenico Paolella
Films about clerical celibacy
Films scored by Gianfranco Reverberi
1970s Italian films